Zimnyak is a rural locality (a settlement) in Igmasskoye Rural Settlement, Nyuksensky District, Vologda Oblast, Russia. The population was 20 as of 2002.

Geography 
Zimnyak is located 46 km southwest of Nyuksenitsa (the district's administrative centre) by road. Peski is the nearest rural locality.

References 

Rural localities in Nyuksensky District